Full House is a British sitcom which aired for three series from 1985 to 1986. It was the last sitcom to be jointly co-created by the sitcom writing team of Johnnie Mortimer and Brian Cooke, however, it was mainly written by Mortimer alone, with Mortimer writing 12 episodes alone, along with a further 3 with Cooke, while another veteran sitcom writer, Vince Powell, contributed another 3.

It starred Christopher Strauli, Sabina Franklyn, Brian Capron and Natalie Forbes, with Diana King, who was later replaced by Joan Sanderson.

It was made by Thames Television for the ITV network.

Plot
The show revolved around two young couples, the Hatfields and the McCoys. Paul Hatfield (played by Strauli) and his wife Marsha (played by Franklyn), married for three years, and up to then living with Paul's mother (played in the first two series by King and then by Sanderson in the third), finally find their ideal home. However, they are unable to meet the mortgage repayments, so they invite Murray McCoy (played by Capron) and his girlfriend Diana (played by Forbes), who are also in the same situation, to join them and move in with them, contributing to the payment of the house. In the final episode of the series, the McCoys are married, and they have a baby.

Episodes

Series One (1985)
1.1. First Time Buyers (7 January 1985)
1.2. And Mother Came Too (14 January 1985)
1.3. Promises, Promises (21 January 1985)
1.4. It's Only Money (28 January 1985)
1.5. Little Secrets (4 February 1985)
1.6. Such Sweet Sorrow (11 February 1985)

Series Two (1985)
2.1. Baby Talk (16 October 1985)
2.2. Where There's A Will (23 October 1985)
2.3. Home Is Where The Art Is (30 October 1985)
2.4. It's A Steal (6 November 1985)
2.5. Semper Fidelis (13 November 1985)
2.6. TV Or Not TV (20 November 1985)
2.7. The Mating Game (27 November 1985)
2.8. May The Best Man Win (4 December 1985)

Series Three (1986)
3.1. It's in the Book (15 October 1986)
3.2. All Work And No Play (22 October 1986)
3.3. The Facts of Life (29 October 1986)
3.4. Old Scores (5 November 1986)
3.5. If at First You Don't Succeed (12 November 1986)
3.6. And Baby Makes Five (19 November 1986)

Production
In common with many other Thames sitcoms from the 1980s, the format of Full House was sold to the US, via the American producer Don L. Taffner, who had a close relationship with Thames and had distributed Thames programmes in the States in both format and syndication. Taffner sold the format to CBS, and his production company made a pilot entitled No Place Like Home, starring Jack Blessing and Susan Hess as the married couple and Rick Lohman and Molly Cheek as the unmarried couple. It aired on CBS on 6 September 1985, but it failed to develop into a full series.

However, the original British series did eventually air in the US in syndication, but by then the more famous American family sitcom also entitled Full House had premiered, so it was renamed Mixed Doubles in the US so as to avoid confusion.

References
Mark Lewisohn, BBC Online Comedy Guide/Radio Times Guide to TV Comedy
British TV Online Resources

External links

Full House at the British TV Online Resources

1985 British television series debuts
1986 British television series endings
1980s British sitcoms
ITV sitcoms
Television shows produced by Thames Television
Television series by Fremantle (company)
English-language television shows
Television shows set in London
Television shows shot at Teddington Studios